, also known by the nickname , is a defunct Japanese weekly seinen manga magazine published by Jitsugyo no Nihon Sha. It started to be published under the name  in 1959. On June 5, 2012, it start to be published twice in a month and the "Weekly" was dropped from its name. On February 19, 2013, the last issue was published and the magazine was declared defunct by Jitsugyo no Nihon Sha.

Serialized works
Listed alphabetically by title.
Robot boy Dotakon (Hosuke Fukuchi)
First Human Giatrus (Shunji Sonoyama)
Heisei Harenchi Gakuen (Go Nagai)
Hitler (Shigeru Mizuki)
The Laughing Salesman (Fujiko Fujio A)
Mandaraya no Ryouta (Jun Hatanaka)
Shizukanaru Don (Tatsuo Nitta)
Sarusuberi (Hinako Sugiura)

References

1959 establishments in Japan
2013 disestablishments in Japan
Weekly manga magazines published in Japan
Magazines established in 1959
Magazines disestablished in 2013
Seinen manga magazines
Defunct magazines published in Japan